Potterville is a city in Eaton County in the U.S. state of Michigan.  The population was 2,617 at the 2010 census.

History
Potterville is named after Linus Potter, who settled his family in the area in November, 1844.  Linus was elected supervisor of Benton Township in 1846.  In 1830, Linus and his wife Diantha came from Cayuga County, New York, by way of the Erie Canal, to Buffalo and then by way of Lake Erie steamboat to Detroit.  From there, Linus and Diantha walked to Plymouth, Michigan, a journey of about thirty miles, before walking on to Saline.  The pair carried their three-year-old son, George, and their infant daughter, Louisa.

Potterville incorporated as a village within Benton Township in 1881, and as a city in 1962 withdrawing it completely from the township.

On July 6, 1994, a lightning strike at Fox Park injured 22 beach-goers.  The lightning struck the water and "walked up the beach."

A rare Michigan earthquake on September 2, 1994, had its epicenter just east of the city.  The shock had a body wave magnitude of 3.5 and a maximum Mercalli intensity of V (Moderate). It could be felt through most of Mid-Michigan.

The city experienced a massive train derailment of 35 Canadian National railroad cars over Memorial Day weekend 2002.  Due to leaking propane from the cars, the entire city was evacuated.  The cause of the derailment was found to have been a faulty rail.

Geography

Demographics

2010 Census
As of the census of 2010, there were 2,617 people, 952 households, and 702 families residing in the city. The racial makeup of the city was 94.2% White, 1.3% African American, 0.6% Native American, 0.5% Asian, 0.6% from other races, and 2.6% from two or more races. Hispanic or Latino of any race were 5.7% of the population.

There were 952 households, of which 45.4% had children under the age of 18 living with them, 51.2% were married couples living together, 16.8% had a female householder with no husband present, 5.8% had a male householder with no wife present, and 26.3% were non-families. 21.6% of all households were made up of individuals, and 4.9% had someone living alone who was 65 years of age or older. The average household size was 2.75 and the average family size was 3.16.

The median age in the city was 32.4 years. 31.2% of residents were under the age of 18; 8.3% were between the ages of 18 and 24; 30% were from 25 to 44; 23.5% were from 45 to 64; and 7.1% were 65 years of age or older. The gender makeup of the city was 48.6% male and 51.4% female.

2000 Census
As of the census of 2000, there were 2,168 people, 802 households, and 572 families residing in the city. The racial makeup of the city was 95.48% White, 0.23% African American, 0.42% Native American, 0.42% Asian, 1.48% from other races, and 1.98% from two or more races. Hispanic or Latino of any race were 4.01% of the population.

There were 802 households, out of which 44.0% had children under the age of 18 living with them, 50.4% were married couples living together, 17.3% had a female householder with no husband present, and 28.6% were non-families. 22.9% of all households were made up of individuals, and 4.9% had someone living alone who was 65 years of age or older.  The average household size was 2.70 and the average family size was 3.18.

In the city, the population was spread out, with 33.7% under the age of 18, 9.0% from 18 to 24, 33.9% from 25 to 44, 18.1% from 45 to 64, and 5.3% who were 65 years of age or older.  The median age was 29 years. For every 100 females, there were 92.5 males.  For every 100 females age 18 and over, there were 87.5 males.

The median income for a household in the city was $42,292, and the median income for a family was $48,182. Males had a median income of $33,988 versus $26,250 for females. The per capita income for the city was $17,880.  About 3.5% of families and 5.9% of the population were below the poverty line, including 5.0% of those under age 18 and 6.0% of those age 65 or over.

Education
The city is served by Potterville Public School District, whose schools are located on one campus along Main Street just east of N. Hartel Road (M-100). The district mascot is the Vikings, with school colors of maroon and gold. This campus includes an elementary, middle, and high school (including sport facilities). Also sharing this campus are the administration and preschool buildings.

Transportation
Potterville is located approximately 12.6 miles (20.2 kilometers) southwest of downtown Lansing and 7 miles (11.2 kilometers) northeast of Charlotte along Lansing Road at its intersection with Hartel Road/M-100.  The city is connected with interstate highway system immediately south of this intersection where M-100 interchanges with I-69.  M-100 also connects Potterville to I-96 just north of Grand Ledge.

The city is serviced by Canadian National Railway (CN) along its Flint Subdivision.

Highways

Highways

Public safety

The City of Potterville Police Department provides law enforcement services to Potterville with three full-time officers, one part-time officer, and a full-time chief. Fire services are provided by the Benton Twp. Fire & EMS Department, which utilizes a combination of full-time, part-time and paid-on-call firefighters/medical personnel, which took effect on September 10, 2019 when the city decided to dissolve the Potterville City Fire Dept. due to unforeseen circumstances.

Notable people
 Joe Davis, announcer for the Los Angeles Dodgers and FOX sports; attended Potterville High School

References

External links
Official Website of the City of Potterville

Cities in Eaton County, Michigan
Lansing–East Lansing metropolitan area
Populated places established in 1844